WJOE may refer to:

 WQVD, a radio station (700 AM) licensed to Orange, Massachusetts, which held the call sign WJOE from 2005 to 2009
 WRDF, a radio station (106.3 FM) licensed to Columbia City, Indiana, which held the call sign WJOE from 2009 to 2011